Helmut Hoelzer was a Nazi Germany V-2 rocket engineer who was brought to the United States under Operation Paperclip. Hoelzer was the inventor and constructor of the world's first electronic analog computer.

Life 
In October 1939, while working for the Telefunken electronics firm in Berlin, Hoelzer met with Ernst Steinhoff, Hermann Steuding, and Wernher von Braun regarding guide beams for a flying body. In late 1940 at Peenemünde, Hoelzer was head of the guide beam division (assistant Henry Otto Hirschler), which developed a guide-plane system which alternates a transmitted signal from two antennas a short distance apart, as well as a vacuum tube mixing device which corrected for momentum that would perturb an object that had been moved back on-track. By the fall of 1941, Hoelzer's "mixing device" was used to provide V-2 rocket rate measurement instead of rate gyros.

Then at the beginning of 1942, Hoelzer built an analog computer to calculate and simulate V-2 rocket trajectories Hoelzer's team also developed the Messina telemetry system. After evacuating Peenemünde for the Alpenfestung (Alpine Fortress), Hoelzer returned to Peenemünde via motorcycle to look for portions of his PhD dissertation prior to surrendering to United States forces at the end of World War II.

Hoelzer was a student of Alwin Walther.

Family 
One of his grandchildren is Olympic swimmer Margaret Hoelzer.

References

Sources

External links
 Helmut Hoelzer Collection, The University of Alabama in Huntsville Archives and Special Collections

1912 births
1996 deaths
Technische Universität Darmstadt alumni
Early spaceflight scientists
German aerospace engineers
German emigrants to the United States
V-weapons people
NASA people
German rocket scientists
German spaceflight pioneers
Operation Paperclip
Engineers from Thuringia
People from Wartburgkreis